Dmitri Andreyevich Velikorodny (born 6 June 2000) is a Russian football player. He plays for FC Novosibirsk on loan from PFC Krylia Sovetov Samara.

Club career
He made his debut in the Russian Professional Football League for FC Chertanovo Moscow on 14 April 2018 in a game against FC Znamya Truda Orekhovo-Zuyevo. He made his Russian Football National League debut for Chertanovo on 8 August 2018 in a game against FC Armavir.

On 5 February 2022, Velikorodny moved to Krylia Sovetov Samara. On 17 February 2022, Velikorodny  was loaned by FC Metallurg Lipetsk.

References

External links
 Profile by Russian Professional Football League

2000 births
Sportspeople from Stavropol
Living people
Russian footballers
Russia youth international footballers
Association football midfielders
FC Chertanovo Moscow players
FC Olimp-Dolgoprudny players
PFC Krylia Sovetov Samara players
FC Metallurg Lipetsk players
Russian First League players
Russian Second League players